Bernard Ramanantsoa (born 26 November 1948) was the Dean of HEC Paris between 1996 and 2015.

Ramanantsoa is the nephew of Gabriel Ramanantsoa, former President of Madagascar. He and his two children are HEC Paris alumni.

He will leave his position in 2015.

Other activities

Corporate boards
 Orange S.A., Independent Member of the Board of Directors (since 2020)

Non-profit organizations
 Bilderberg Group, Member 
 EuropaNova, Member of the Board of Directors

References

External links

1948 births
Living people
Supaéro alumni
HEC Paris alumni
French people of Malagasy descent
Chevaliers of the Légion d'honneur
Business school deans
French academic administrators